Arthur Christopher John Russell (29 August 1879 – 6 August 1925) was an Australian rules footballer who played with Melbourne in the Victorian Football League (VFL).

Notes

External links 

		
Demonwiki profile

1879 births
1925 deaths
Australian rules footballers from Victoria (Australia)
Melbourne Football Club players
People educated at Scotch College, Melbourne